Amsterdam is an unincorporated community in Botetourt County, Virginia, United States.

In an 1855 gazetteer, it was listed as "a post-village" (stagecoach stop) that contained "1 brick church and several tradesmen's shops."

References

Unincorporated communities in Botetourt County, Virginia
Unincorporated communities in Virginia